WRRL (1130 AM, "The River 107.7") is a classic rock formatted broadcast radio station licensed to Rainelle, West Virginia, serving Rainelle and Rupert in West Virginia.  WRRL is owned and operated by Shilo Communications, Inc.

History
On June 5, 2017, WRRL changed their format from southern gospel to classic rock, branded as "The River 107.7" (simulcast on W299CF 107.7 FM Fayetteville).

Translators

References

External links
The River 107.7 Online

1974 establishments in West Virginia
Radio stations established in 1974
RRL
Classic rock radio stations in the United States
RRL